Adrián Alanís Quiñones (born 5 March 1949) is a Mexican architect and politician affiliated with the Institutional Revolutionary Party.  he served as Senator of the LVIII and LIX Legislatures of the Mexican Congress representing Durango.

References

1949 births
Living people
Politicians from Durango
People from Durango City
Mexican architects
Members of the Senate of the Republic (Mexico)
Institutional Revolutionary Party politicians
21st-century Mexican politicians
National Autonomous University of Mexico alumni
Members of the Congress of Durango
20th-century Mexican politicians